Təndul (also, Təndül) is a village in the Lerik Rayon of Azerbaijan.  The village forms part of the municipality of Dico.

References 

Populated places in Lerik District